The 2013–14 Pro50 Championship was the twelfth edition of the Pro50 Championship, a List A cricket tournament in Zimbabwe. The competition began on 7 December 2013 and the final was played on 30 April 2014.

Mountaineers won the tournament for the second time, defeating the Southern Rocks in the final by 7 wickets.

Mountaineers batsman Hamilton Masakadza was the tournament's leading run-scorer with a total of 260 runs. Donald Tiripano of the Mountaineers and Tawanda Mupariwa of the Matabeleland Tuskers were the leading wicket-tackers with a total of 13 wickets each.

Points table

 Qualified for the final

Fixtures

Round-robin

Final

References

External links
 Series home at ESPN Cricinfo

2013 in Zimbabwean cricket
2014 in Zimbabwean cricket
Pro50 Championship
Pro50 Championship